Navia Nguyen (born 1973) is a Vietnamese American model and actress.

Early life
Nguyen was born in Phu Quoc, South Vietnam, and grew up in New York City. She moved to London to study at Central Saint Martins.

Career 
Nguyen was spotted by a photographer while shopping in Camden Town. Nguyen appeared in the 1996 Pirelli Calendar and the Sports Illustrated Swimsuit Issue in 1997, becoming the first Asian model to do so. Selected by People Magazine''' as being among the "50 Most Beautiful People", she has modeled for leading fashion houses like Chanel, Karl Lagerfeld, John Galliano, Fendi, and Christian Dior, as well as large American firms such as: GAP and Tommy Hilfiger.

Among her movie credits are supporting roles in Memoirs of a Geisha and Hitch. She also appeared as Tatiana in the pilot episode of Sex and the City''.

By 2009, Nguyen had left acting and modeling, and developed AMO Beauty Spa in Bali, where she currently resides with her daughter.

Filmography

Film

Television

References

External links
 
 

1973 births
Living people
American people of Vietnamese descent
American female models
Models from New York City
Alumni of Central Saint Martins
Actresses of Vietnamese descent
Actresses from New York City
21st-century American women